Norfentanyl is an inactive synthetic opioid analgesic drug precursor. It is an analog and metabolite of fentanyl with the removal of the phenethyl moiety (or functional group) from fentanyl chemical structure.

Occurrence and Applications
Norfentanyl occurs primarily as a metabolite of its parent drug, fentanyl. However, it can also be used to synthesize fentanyl itself.

See also
 3-Methylbutyrfentanyl
 4-Fluorobutyrfentanyl
 4-Fluorofentanyl
 α-Methylfentanyl
 Acetylfentanyl
 Benzylfentanyl
 Furanylfentanyl
 Homofentanyl
 List of fentanyl analogues

References

Further reading 

 
 
 
 
 

Synthetic opioids
4-Piperidinyl compounds
Anilides
Mu-opioid receptor agonists
Acetanilides